The Galali or Kalali were an indigenous Australian people of the state of Queensland.

Language
Garlali is now extinct, but some outlines of the language were written out by Nils Holmer, Maryalyce McDonald and Stephen Wurm.

The Garlali spoke two languages, the Bulloo River language and the Wilson River language, both shared with other peoples.

Country
Proceeding west from Eulo to Thargomindah and the Bulloo River, and upstream as far as Norley. Their southern extension went as far as, Clyde, Orient and Currawinya.

The descendants of the Kalali speakers mostly live in Brisbane, Cherbourg (the old Aboriginal Mission), and small New South Wales and Queensland towns such as Bourke, Thargomindah, Cunnamulla, and Charleville.

Social organization and customs
The Kalali practiced neither circumcision nor subincision.

Alternative names
 Galali
 Kullali
 Kullally
 Kalili. (? typo)

Following Breen, these have sometimes been spelled Garlali, Galarli, etc., but the retroflex rl does not seem to be distinctive and so should not be written (Breen 2007:191 Reassessing Karnic.)

Notes

Citations

Sources

Aboriginal peoples of Queensland